The Pacific League is a high school athletic conference in Los Angeles County, California affiliated with the CIF Southern Section. Members include two high schools in the Burbank Unified School District, three in the Glendale Unified School District, two in the Pasadena Unified School District, and one in Arcadia.

Schools
As of 2019, the schools in the league are:
Arcadia High School
Burbank High School	
Burroughs High School (Burbank, California)
Crescenta Valley High School (La Crescenta, California)
Glendale High School - Does not compete in a league football schedule
Hoover High School (Glendale, California) - Does not compete in a league football schedule
Muir High School (Pasadena, California)
Pasadena High School

References

CIF Southern Section leagues